Philippe Washer (6 August 1924 – 27 November 2015) was a Belgian tennis player. He competed in the Davis Cup a number of times, from 1946 to 1961.

Early life and family
Philippe Washer was born on 6 August 1924 in Brussels. He was the son of Jean Washer, another Belgian tennis player and textile industry mogul. His mother, Simone van der Straeten, was the granddaughter of Ernest Solvay, founder of Solvay International Chemical Group. Philippe had three brothers: Paul Washer, president of the Chemical Industry Federation of Belgium and director of the Solvay company; Jacques Washer, antiquarian who died in the Swissair Flight 316 crash; and Edouard. They were also the cousins of famous sportscar racer Olivier Gendebien. Philippe started playing tennis at the age of six. He was coached by his father. He won his first tournament on 9 May 1940 in La Rasante just one day before the Battle of Belgium during which he volunteered to join the Belgian Army. In 1942 he won the French junior championships.

Tennis career
Washer won the Belgian National Championships nine times between 1945–1954, the only exception being 1950 when he was forced to retire from the competition due to illness. In 1952, he reached the semifinal of the Royal Belgian Tennis Federation Fiftieth Anniversary tournament. In 1957, he reached the Inter-Zonal Zone Finals of the Davis Cup with the Belgium Davis Cup team. The same year he won the Lebanon international tennis championships by defeating Warren Woodcock. In 1967 he came back from retirement to win the Belgian National Covered Courts Championship doubles, partnering with Jacky Brichant. Also after retirement, he won the Wimbledon Veterans' Doubles with Jaroslav Drobný four times from 1968 to 1971.

Golf career
Washer did not play in the 1960 Davis Cup match against Great Britain as he was competing in the Belgium Open golf championship. Later in 1960 he played for the Rest of Europe against the British Isles in the St Andrews Trophy and for Belgium in the 1960 Eisenhower Trophy. He represented Belgium again in the 1964 Eisenhower Trophy.

Personal life
Washer retired from tennis in 1961 and moved to Switzerland. In 1955 he lent his own Ferrari 250 Europa GT Pinin Farina Coupe car to Olivier Gendebien who drove it in the Liège–Rome–Liège rally and finished third. After retiring he served as the president of the Royal Léopold Club between 1983 and 1994, which his family saved from bankruptcy in 1948. He remained its major shareholder afterwards. Washer died on 27 November 2015 at the age of 91.

Footnotes

Works cited

External links

 
 
 

1924 births
2015 deaths
Belgian male tennis players
Belgian male golfers
Sportspeople from Brussels
Belgian military personnel of World War II